Macchio is a surname. Notable people with the surname include:

Baron Karl von Macchio (1859–1945), Austro-Hungarian diplomat
Ralph Macchio (born 1961), American actor
Ralph Macchio (born 1964), American comic book editor and writer